Oger may refer to:

 Ogre, Latvia
 Oger, Marne, France
 Saudi Oger, a Saudi construction company

People with the name

Given name
 Oger Klos (born 1993), Dutch professional footballer

Surname
 Thomas Oger (born 1980), Monegasque tennis tour professional
 Vural Öger (born 1942),German politician and businessman
 Yves Oger (1951–2019), French Olympic rower

See also
 
 Ogre (disambiguation)